The Turn of the Century is a 2001 Russian drama film directed by Konstantin Lopushansky. The narrative is set a few years after the fall of the Soviet Union, and follows a Russian female journalist and her mother, as the mother is offered to erase her memories at a clinic so she will be able to adapt to the new lifestyle.

Cast
 Svetlana Svirko as Olga
 Irina Sokolova
 Roman Viktyuk
 Aleksandr Baluev
 Dmitriy Shevchenko

Reception
Variety's Todd McCarthy wrote:
Dostoevskian in its dour pessimism, this first film in seven years by Tarkovsky protege Konstantin Lopushansky overflows with such sorrow for the moral blankness it finds in Mother Russia today that it is hard not to sympathize to some degree with so deeply felt an expression of angst. But the film is decidedly heavy going, its symbols and messages advanced with unfortunate bluntness, meaning that even its intended audience on the high art end of the fest and international specialized circuit will have to overlook the cumbersome dramatics to appreciate its insights.

The film was nominated for the Nika Award for Best Screenplay.

References

2001 drama films
2001 films
Films directed by Konstantin Lopushansky
Films set in the 1990s
Russian drama films
2000s Russian-language films